The Sweden national badminton team represents Sweden in international badminton team competitions. It is controlled by Badminton Sweden, the national organization for badminton in the country.

Sweden once dominated the European badminton scene, winning the European Mixed Team Badminton Championships and finishing up as semifinalists twice at the Uber Cup in the 1990s. The national team recently reached the quarterfinals in the 2020 European Women's Team Badminton Championships.

Participation in BWF competitions

Thomas Cup

Uber Cup

Sudirman Cup

Participation in European Team Badminton Championships

Men's Team

Women's Team

Mixed Team

Participation in European Junior Team Badminton Championships
Mixed Team

Current squad 

The following players were selected to represent Sweden at the 2020 European Men's and Women's Team Badminton Championships.

Male players
Felix Burestedt
Tim Foo
Joel Hansson
Carl Harrbacka
Albin Carl Hjelm
Jacob Nilsson
Ludvig Petre Olsson
Andy Tsai
Melker Z-Bexell

Female players
Emma Karlsson
Rebecca Kuhl
Johanna Magnusson
Clara Nistad
Ashwathi Pillai
Moa Sjöö
Tilda Sjöö
Edith Urell
Cecilia Wang

See also 
 Swedish National Badminton Championships

References

National badminton teams
Badminton
Badminton in Sweden